Mohammad Taghi Majidi (26 November 1911 – 11 April 1979) was an Iranian Lieutenant-General and military leader.

History
Majidi was born in Rasht on 26 November 1911 and came to Tehran after completing his secondary education in this city and entered the officer's college. He graduated from this college in 1932.

Majidi chose his military activities in the ground forces and infantry and in 1946 he achieved the rank of colonel and became the commander of the infantry brigade of the officer's college. After that, in 1950, he was appointed to the command of Zahedan Brigade in 1950 and after the 1953 Iranian coup d'état with the rank of brigadier general. After some time, he was transferred to Tehran and became the commander of the Central Infantry Division.

Majidi was later appointed head of the military courts against Tudeh Party's network of officers and issued the death sentence for these officers during the three terms of the military court of first instance. Following the assassination attempt on Hossein Ala' by members of the Fadaiyan-e-Islam and the arrest of members of this group, General Majidi presided over the relevant court and issued a death sentence for Nawab Safavid.

In 1957, he was appointed to the rank of Major General and Commander of the Persian National Guard Corps, and then after receiving the rank of Lieutenant general (Sepahbod), he was elected to the command of the Central Corps and General Majidi retired in 1966.

After the revolution
General Majidi was arrested and executed after the Revolution of 1979 due to the Navab Safavid of Military Court and the issuance of a death sentence for him. and Majidi was shot in Evening of 11 April 1979.

References

1911 births
1979 deaths
Imperial Iranian Army lieutenant generals
Military personnel executed during the Iranian Revolution
People from Rasht